This is a list of the amphibian and reptile species recorded in Gibraltar. There are five amphibian and twenty-five reptile species in Gibraltar, of which one is critically endangered, two are endangered, one is vulnerable, and three are near threatened.

The following tags are used to highlight each species' conservation status as assessed by the International Union for Conservation of Nature:

Some species were assessed using an earlier set of criteria. Species assessed using this system have the following instead of near threatened and least concern categories:

Class: Amphibia

Order: Caudata (salamanders)

Family: Salamandridae (newts)
Genus: Pleurodeles
 Iberian ribbed newt, Pleurodeles waltl NT

Order: Anura (frogs and toads)

Suborder: Mesobatrachia
Family: Pelobatidae
Genus: Pelobates
 Western spadefoot toad, Pelobates cultripes
Family: Bufonidae
Genus: Bufo
 Common toad, Bufo bufo LC
Family: Hylidae
Genus: Hyla
 Mediterranean tree frog, Hyla meridionalis LC
Family: Ranidae
Genus: Rana
 Perez's frog, Rana perezi LC

Class: Reptilia

Order: Testudines (turtles, tortoises and terrapins)

Family: Cheloniidae
Genus: Caretta
 Loggerhead sea turtle, Caretta caretta EN
Genus: Chelonia
 Green turtle, Chelonia mydas EN
Family: Dermochelyidae
Genus: Dermochelys
 Leatherback turtle, Dermochelys coriacea CR
Family: Emydidae
Genus: Emys
 European pond terrapin, Emys orbicularis LR/nt
Genus: Trachemys
 Red-eared slider, Trachemys scripta LC
Suborder: Cryptodira
Superfamily: Testudinoidea
Family: Geoemydidae
Subfamily: Geoemydinae
Genus: Mauremys
 Mediterranean pond turtle, Mauremys leprosa
Family: Testudinidae
Genus: Testudo
 Spur-thighed tortoise, Testudo graeca VU

Order: Squamata (scaled reptiles)

Suborder: Sauria
Family: Chamaeleonidae
Genus: Chamaeleo
 Common chameleon, Chamaeleo chamaeleon
Family: Gekkonidae
Genus: Hemidactylus
Mediterranean house gecko, Hemidactylus turcicus
Genus: Tarentola
 Moorish gecko, Tarentola mauritanica
Family: Scincidae (skinks)
Genus: Chalcides
 Bedriaga's skink, Chalcides bedriagai NT
 Western three-toed skink, Chalcides striatus LC
Family: Lacertidae (wall lizards)
Genus: Acanthodactylus
 Red-tailed spiny-footed lizard, Acanthodactylus erythrurus LC
Genus: Timon
 Ocellated lizard, Timon lepidus
Genus: Podarcis
 Iberian wall lizard, Podarcis hispanica
Genus: Psammodromus
 Algerian sand racer, Psammodromus algirus LC
Family: Amphisbaenidae (worm lizards)
Genus: Blanus
 Iberian worm lizard, Blanus cinereus LC
Suborder: Serpentes (snakes)
Family: Colubridae
Genus: Hemorrhois
 Horseshoe whip snake, Hemorrhois hippocrepis LC
Genus: Coronella
 Southern smooth snake, Coronella girondica LC
Genus: Rhinechis
 Ladder snake, Rhinechis scalaris LC
Genus: Malpolon
 Montpellier snake, Malpolon monspessulanus
Genus: Macroprotodon
 Western false smooth snake, Macroprotodon brevis NT
Genus: Natrix
 Viperine snake, Natrix maura
 Grass snake, Natrix natrix
Family: Viperidae
Genus: Vipera
 Lataste's viper, Vipera latastei LC

See also
 List of birds of Gibraltar
 List of mammals of Gibraltar

References

Gibraltar
 A
Amphibians and reptiles
Gibraltar